Flight Risk may refer to:
 Risks associated with flights or aviation
 A term to describe a person under custody of law enforcement who is considered likely to abscond, see bail hearing as used in the United States

Music and literature
 Flight Risk (album), 2011 album by The Jacka
 Flight Risk, 2011 mixtape by SL Jones
 Flight Risk: Memoirs of a New Orleans Bad Boy, 2017 book by James Nolan
 Flight Risk, 2017 novel by Jennifer Fenn

Television

 "Flight Risk", 2008 episode of the television series CSI: Miami
 "Flight Risk", 2011 episode of the television series Law & Order: Special Victims Unit
 "Flight Risk", 2012 episode of the television series Elementary
 "Flight Risk", 2017 episode of the television series Lethal Weapon

Other uses